Clifford House may refer to:

 Clifford House (Eustis, Florida)
 Clifford House (Reno, Nevada)
 Clifford House, Toowoomba, a heritage-listed house in Queensland, Australia